Listen to Day is a 1960 album by the American singer Doris Day. The album mostly consists of Day's singles from the 1950s.

In March 1960 Billboard magazine reported that Columbia Records was declaring April of that year 'Doris Day Month' and had released Listen to Day as a limited release available with every purchase of Day's album What Every Girl Should Know. Allmusic rated the album 3 stars out of 5.

It peaked at 26 on the Billboard 200 album chart. Day's biographer Tom Santopietro described Listen to Day as a "mixed bag" that was "hastily put together to capitalize on Day's extraordinary popularity" and that it featured "too many mediocre songs".

Track listing
"Pillow Talk" (Buddy Pepper, Inez James) – 2:10
"Heart Full of Love" (Albert Beach, Guy Wood) – 2:42
"Anyway the Wind Blows" (Joseph Hooven, Marilyn Hooven, William D. "By" Dunham – 2:20
"Oh! What a Lover You'll Be" (J. Hooven, M. Hooven) – 2:10
"No" (Lee Pockriss, P. J. Vance) – 2:05
"Love Me in the Daytime" (Bob Hillard, Robert Allen) – 2:46
"I Enjoy Being a Girl" (Oscar Hammerstein II, Richard Rodgers) – 2:35
"Tunnel of Love" (Bob Roberts, Patty Fisher) – 2:10
"He's So Married" (Jimmy Dodd, Will Fowler) – 2:22
"Roly Poly" (Sol Lake and Elsa Doran) – 2:15
"Possess Me" (Irving Roth, Joe Lubin) – 2:50
"Inspiration" (Roth, Lubin) – 2:05

Personnel
Doris Day – vocals
Frank DeVol, Jack Marshall – arranger

Charts

References

1960 albums
Doris Day albums
Columbia Records albums
Albums arranged by Frank De Vol
Albums arranged by Jack Marshall (composer)